Avis and Effie Hotchkiss, mother and daughter from Brooklyn, New York, were pioneering motorcyclists who completed a  round trip ride from New York to San Francisco and back on a Harley-Davidson motorcycle-sidecar combination in 1915.

Effie Hotchkiss learned to ride a motorcycle at age 16, after instruction from her brother, and her first motorcycle was a Marsh & Metz. In 1915 she acquired a new Harley-Davidson Model 11-F with a sidecar, the first H-D to feature a 3-speed gearbox. She had an ambition to become the first woman to cross the United States on a motorcycle, and decided to visit the Panama Pacific International Exposition in San Francisco.  On May 2, 1915, she set out with her mother Avis in the sidecar, who noted, "I do not fear breakdowns for Effie, being a most careful driver, is a good mechanic and does her own repairing with her own tools." The pair took two months to reach San Francisco, and were photographed pouring out a jar of Atlantic sea water they had carried from New York, into the Pacific Ocean at Ocean Beach.
The success of their journey made Effie and Avis Hotchkiss the first transcontinental female motorcyclists.

See also
List of long-distance motorcycle riders
Van Buren sisters

Notes

References

 
 

Long-distance motorcycle riders
Women motorcyclists
People from Brooklyn